John Rennie Short is a professor of geography and public policy in the School of Public Policy at University of Maryland, Baltimore County.

Early life and education

Short was born in Stirling, Scotland. He was raised in nearby Tullibody, a village in the County of Clackmannanshire. He attended the county grammar school, Alloa Academy. He received the MA in geography from Aberdeen University in 1973. followed by a PhD in geography from the University of Bristol, with a received dissertation, "Residential Mobility in The Private Housing Market of Bristol" (1977). From 1976 to 1978, he was a postdoctoral research fellow in Bristol's School of Geographical Sciences.

Career

In 1978, Short was appointed lecturer in geography at the University of Reading.  From 1985 to 1987, he was also visiting senior research fellow at the Urban Research Unit of the Australian National University. He left Reading in 1990 to join Syracuse University's Maxwell School of Citizenship and Public Affairs as professor of geography. In 2002, he left Syracuse for an appointment as professor and chair of the Department of Geography and Environmental Systems at the University of Maryland, Baltimore County (UMBC). He was appointed to his current position in the School of Public Policy at UMBC in 2005.

Short has published in human geography's subfields, including the urban, the political, the environmental, the economic, and the cultural. His scholarship incorporates social and cultural theory methodologies, archival research strategies, and data analyses. 
 
Short's work has been presented on television in podcasts and radio interviews, print interviews in national and special newspapers and essays on scholarly/journalistic websites.

His work has been translated into many languages including  Arabic, Chinese, Czech, Italian, Japanese, Korean, Persian, Portuguese, Spanish, and Turkish.

Selected Awards
 2020 Fulbright Research Fellowship 
 2009 Helen and John S. Best Fellowship American Geographical Society Library
 2002 Leverhulme Professorship 
 2001 Alexander O. Vietor Fellowship Beinecke Library Yale University
 2001 Frank Hideo Kono Visiting Fellowship Huntington Library
 2000 Appleby-Mosher Research Award Maxwell School Syracuse University
 1999 Dibner Library Fellowship Smithsonian Institution  
 1996 National Endowment for Humanities Fellowship Newberry Library
 1996 Andrew Mellon Fellowship American Philosophical Society
 1996 Appleby-Mosher Research Award Maxwell School Syracuse University
 1995 Research Fellowship New York State Library
 1990 Erasmus Professorship Groningen University
 1985 Senior Visiting Research Fellowship Australian National University
 1985 British Academy Visiting Fellowship Huntington Library
 1976 Social Science Research Council Postdoctoral Fellowship

Scholarship

Short's research papers contribute to four main areas of political economy.

The first is an exploration of urban society. Amongst many articles and book chapters, his work includes a long engagement with analysing housing dynamics to broader concerns with the pandemic and the city, generating models of metropolitan change, urban cultural economy, traffic issues, immigration, suburban change, the relationship between globalisation and cities, measuring the extent of globalisation in cities, urban flânerie, urban environmental issues, climate change, how city regions seek to reposition themselves in discursive space through branding campaigns and the hosting of the Olympic Games. More recent work has focused on social inclusion in cities and cities in the Global South including the rise of new middle class and the informal economy in the Colombian city of Cali.

A second body of work contributes to broader issues of cultural economy and politics. An influential text, Imagined Country first published in 1991 and reissued in 2005, was an important part of the cultural turn. In that book Short elaborated the idea of national environmental ideologies though the depictions of wilderness, countryside and city in landscape painting, cinema and novels. Other  work focuses on globalisation, language, wealth, wealth and political power, and wealth and immigration.

A third contribution is to  political geography and geopolitics. His work on the US includes analyses of elections,
voting systems, gerrymandering, and legitimation crisis. Work on geopolitics includes issues in the East China and South China Seas. In 2020 he was awarded  a Fulbright Fellowship to research the geopolitics of the South China Sea.

The fourth theme, mainly expressed in book form, is the history of cartography. Short builds upon and extends the work of the critical cartographic theorist John Brian Harley to deconstruct maps as social and political texts. Short explores the power dynamics in how the USA and Korea were represented in maps, the creation of a spatial sensitivity in the early modern era, the role of indigenous people in so-called exploration and discovery of the New World, and the emergence of the national atlas as important feature of modern nationalism. He has also penned a general introduction to the subject.

He has promoted the publication of younger scholars’ work  through editorship of three-book series Space Place and Society, Cities  and Critical Introductions to Urbanism and the City.

He served on the inaugural editorial board of the journals Environment and Planning D: Society and Space. and 
Sustainability. He is on the board of Journal of Urban Affairs. He is the chief editor of Social Inclusion in Cities.

Authored books

2022  The Rise and Fall of the National Atlas in the Twentieth Century. Anthem Press. .

2021  Geopolitics: Making Sense of a Changing Word. Rowman and Littlefield. .

2021  Stress Testing the USA: Public Policy and Reaction to Disaster Events (2nd edition). Palgrave Macmillan. .

2021  Housing in Britain: The Postwar Experience (reprinting of 1982 book). Routledge.  .

2021  Housing and Residential Structure: Alternative Approaches (reprinting of 1980 book). Routledge.  (Co-authored with Keith Bassett) .

2019  World Regional Geography. Oxford University Press. .

2018  The Unequal City: Urban Resurgence, Displacement and The Making of Inequality in Global Cities. Routledge, .

2018  Human Geography: A Short Introduction. (2nd ed.) Oxford University Press, .

2018  Hosting the Olympic Games: The Real Costs for Cities. Routledge, .

2018  A Regional Geography of the United States and Canada: Toward A Sustainable Future. Rowman and Littlefield, (Co-authored with Lisa Benton-Short and Chris Mayda), .

2014  Urban Theory (2nd ed.) Palgrave Macmillan. (Translated into Chinese and Persian), 

2014  Human Geography A Short Introduction. Oxford University Press, .

2013  Stress Testing The USA: Public Policy and Reaction to Disaster Events. Palgrave Macmillan, .

2013  Cities and Nature (2nd ed.) Routledge (Co-authored with Lisa Benton-Short), .

2012  Korea: A Cartographic History. University of Chicago Press (Translated into Korean), 

2012  Globalization, Modernity and The City. Routledge, .

2010  Cities and Suburbs: New Metropolitan Realities in the US. Routledge (Co-authored with B. Hanlon and T. Vicino), .

2009  Cartographic Encounters: Indigenous Peoples and The Exploration of The New World. Reaktion/University of Chicago Press, .

2008  Cities and Economy. Routledge (Co-authored with Y. Kim). (Translated into Persian), .

2008 Cities and Nature. Routledge (Co-authored with Lisa Benton-Short). .

2007  Liquid City: Megalopolis Revisited. Resources for The Future Press/Johns Hopkins University Press, .

2006  Alabaster Cities: Urban US Since 1950. Syracuse University Press, .

2006  Urban Theory. Palgrave Macmillan. (Translated into Chinese and Persian), 

2005  Imagined Country. Syracuse University Press (Reprint with new introduction), .

2004  Making Space: Revisioning The World, 1475–1600. Syracuse University Press, .

2004  Global Metropolitan. Routledge. (Translated into Persian), .

2004  Representing the Republic. Reaktion/University of Chicago Press, .

2003  The World Through Maps. Firefly, .

2001  Global Dimensions: Space, Place and The Contemporary World Reaktion University of Chicago Press (Translated into Chinese), .

2000  Alternative Geographies. Prentice Hall, .

1999  Globalization and The City. Addison Wesley Longman (Co-authored with Y. Kim) (Translated into Persian),  (paperback).

1999  Environmental Discourses and Practice.  Blackwell (Co-authored with L. M. Benton), .

1998  New Worlds, New Geographies. Syracuse University Press, .

1996  The Urban Order.  Blackwell (Translated into Korean, Chinese and Persian), .

1993  An Introduction to Political Geography. Routledge (Second, revised and enlarged, edition) .

1991  Imagined Country: Environment, Culture and Society. Routledge, .

1989  The Humane City.  Blackwell (Translated into Korean, 2000), .

1986  Housebuilding, Planning and Community Action. Routledge (Co-authored with S. Fleming and S. Witt) .

1984  The Urban Arena. Macmillan .

1984  An Introduction to Urban Geography. Routledge .

1982  Housing in Britain. Methuen .

1982  An Introduction to Political Geography. RKP .

1980  Urban Data Sources. Butterworths .

1980  Housing and Residential Structure.  Routledge. (Co-authored with K. Bassett), .

Edited books

2022  Pandemic and The City: Urban Issues in the Context of COVID-19. (Guest Editor).

2019  Assessing The New Urban Agenda. (Guest Editor).

2017  A Research Agenda for Cities. Edward Elgar Agendas (Editor), .

2008  The Sage Companion to The City. Sage (Co-edited with T. Hall and P. Hubbard), .

2002  Globalization and The Margins. Palgrave (Co-edited with R. Grant),.

2000  Environmental Discourses and Practice: A Reader. Blackwell (Co-edited with L. M. Benton),.

1992  Human Settlement. Oxford University Press (Editor), .

1985  Developing Contemporary Marxism. Macmillan (Co-edited with Z. Baranski), .

1984  The Human Geography of Contemporary Britain. Macmillan (Co-edited with A. Kirby), .

See also

 Cultural turn
 Spatial turn

References 

1951 births
Scottish geographers
People from Stirling
British expatriate academics in the United States
Academics of the University of Reading
Syracuse University faculty
Scottish expatriates in the United States
University of Maryland, Baltimore County faculty
Alumni of the University of Bristol
People educated at Alloa Academy
Alumni of the University of Aberdeen
20th-century Scottish writers
21st-century Scottish writers
20th-century British male writers
21st-century British male writers
Living people